Seven Men of Gascony is a 1949 adventure novel by the British writer R.F. Delderfield. It follows the fate of seven characters through the Napoleonic Wars to the climactic Battle of Waterloo.

References

Bibliography
 Sternlicht, Sanford. R.F. Delderfield. Twayne Publishers, 1988.

1949 British novels
British historical novels
British adventure novels
Novels by R. F. Delderfield
Novels set in the 1810s
Novels set during the Napoleonic Wars
Novels set in France